Tweet's Ladies of Pasadena is a 1970 cult film written, produced, directed and starring Timothy Carey.

The film was originally shot as a pilot for a potential television series.

Premise
A man, Tweet, is a member of a roller skating knitting club for old ladies.

References

External links

American independent films
1970 films
American comedy films
1970 comedy films
1970 independent films
1970s English-language films
1970s American films